Carleton Beals (November 13, 1893 – April 4, 1979) was an American journalist, writer, historian, and political activist with special interests in Latin America. A major journalistic coup for him was his interview with Nicaraguan rebel, Augusto Sandino in February 1928. In the 1920s he was part of the cosmopolitan group of intellectuals, artists, and journalists in Mexico City. He remained an active, prolific, and politically engaged leftist journalist and is the subject of a scholarly biography.

Early years
Beals was born in Medicine Lodge, Kansas.  His father, Leon Eli Beals (1864–1941), lawyer and journalist, was the stepson of Carrie Nation, the temperance movement advocate. His mother was Elvina Sybilla Blickensderfer (1867–?).  His brother, Ralph Leon Beals (1901–85), was the first anthropologist at University of California, Los Angeles.

The family moved from Kansas when Beals was age three, and he attended school in Pasadena, California. After graduating from high school in 1911, he worked a variety of jobs while attending the University of California, Berkeley where he studied engineering and mining. He won the Bonnheim Essay Prize and the Bryce History Essay Prize. After graduating in 1916, cum laude, he attended Columbia University on a graduate scholarship, earning a master's degree in 1917.

Career

Unable to find work as a writer, Beals took a job with Standard Oil Company, but it did not suit him. In 1918, he spent a brief period of time in jail as a World War I draft evader.  Upon release, he decided to go see the world, and with what little money he had, Beals and his wife Lillian drove to Mexico.  There, he founded the English Preparatory Institute in 1919, taught at the American High School during 1919 to 1920, and was on the personal staff of President Carranza (1920). They left Mexico in 1921 for Europe where Beals studied at the University of Madrid, and then the University of Rome. Back in Mexico, he became a correspondent for The Nation, separated from his wife, and became romantically involved with photographer Tina Modotti's sister, Mercedes.

In February 1928, Oswald Garrison Villard, editor of The Nation, sent Beals to Nicaragua to write a series of articles. He became notable as the only foreign journalist who interviewed General Augusto Sandino during Nicaragua's 1927–33 war against US military occupation.

In all, Beals wrote over 200 magazine articles for publications such as the New Republic and Harper's Magazine.  Beals also wrote more than 45 books, including on history, geography, and travel.  Some of his books are written for a juvenile audience. His autobiography, Glass Houses, was published by J.B. Lippincott Company in 1938. In 1931, Beals was awarded the John Simon Guggenheim Memorial Foundation Fellowship for biographies. His biography subjects included Porfirio Díaz, Huey P. Long, Roberto de la Selva, Stephen F. Austin, John Eliot, Carrie Nation, and Leon Trotsky.

During his career, Beals witnessed Mexican revolutions, lectured on Shakespeare, and was held incommunicado by a Mexican general. His travels took him to French Morocco, Tunisia, Algiers, Greece, Turkey, the Soviet Union, Germany, and the Caribbean. He was a Ford Hall Forum speaker in 1936, and a member of the American Committee for the Defense of Leon Trotsky in 1937. The following year, Time magazine called Beals, "the best informed and the most awkward living writer on Latin America."

Later years
During the 1960s, he supported the Fair Play for Cuba Committee. Beals was a hero to the young people of Cuba.

In his later years, Beals lived on Fire Tower Road in Killingworth, Connecticut.  He is buried in Killingworth's Evergreen Cemetery.

Partial bibliography

 1921, The Mexican As He is
 1922, Magdalene of Michoacan
 1923, Rome Or Death; the Story of Fascism
 1923, Mexico; an Interpretation (Agrarian land reform in Mexico)
 1925, Tasks Awaiting President Calles of Mexico
 1926, The Church Problem in Mexico
 1927, Brimstone and Chili: A Book of Personal Experiences in the Southwest and in Mexico
 1929, Mexico's New Leader
 1929, Destroying Victor
 1930, The Coming Struggle for Latin America
 1931, Mexican Maze, with illustrations by Diego Rivera
 1932, Porfirio Díaz. Dictator of Mexico
 1932, Banana Gold
 1933, The Crime of Cuba, with photographs by Walker Evans
 1934, Fire on the Andes
 1934, Black River
 1935, Rifle Rule in Cuba
 1935, The Story of Huey P. Long
 1936, The Stones Awake: A Novel of Mexico
 1936, Prologue to Cuban Freedom
 1937, America South
 1937, The New Genre of Roberto de la Selva
 1937, The Drug Eaters of the High Andes
 1938, Glass Houses, Ten Years of Free-Lancing
 1939, American Earth; the Biography of a Nation
 1939, The Coming Struggle for Latin America
 1940, Pan America
 1943, Dawn over the Amazon
 1948, Lands of the Dawning Morrow: The Awakening from Rio Grande to Cape Horn
 1949, The Long Land: Chile
 1953, First Men of America
 1953, Stephen F. Austin, Father of Texas
 1955, Our Yankee Heritage: New England's Contribution to American Civilazation
 1956, Adventure of the Western Sea, illustrated by Jacob Landau
 1956, Taste of Glory; a Novel
 1957, John Eliot, the Man Who Loved the Indians (July 31, 1604 – May 20, 1690)
 1958, House in Mexico
 1960, Cuba's Revolution: The First Year
 1960, Brass-Knuckle Crusade; the Great Know-Nothing Conspiracy, 1820–1860
 1961, Nomads and Empire Builders; Native Peoples and Cultures of South America
 1962, Cyclone Carry, the Story of Carry Nation
 1963, Latin America: World in Revolution
 1963, Eagles of the Andes: South American Struggles for Independence
 1965, War Within a War; the Confederacy Against Itself
 1967, Land of the Mayas; Yesterday and Today
 1968, The Great Revolt and Its Leaders: The History of Popular American Uprisings in the 1890s
 1969, The Case of Leon Trotsky [Lev Davydovič Trockij]: Report of Hearings On the Charges Made Against Him in the Moscow Trails
 1970, Stories Told by the Aztecs Before the Spaniards Came
 1970, The Nature of Revolution
 1970, Great Guerrilla Warriors
 1970, Colonial Rhode Island
 1973, The Incredible Incas: Yesterday and Today

References

External links
 Beals' portrait
 Beals' articles:
"The Scottsboro Puppet Show", The Nation, 1936
 "The Black Shirt Revolution, The Nation, 1922
 Beals' testimony, Fair Play for Cuba Committee, 1960
 "The Fewer Outsiders the Better," article by Beals critical of the American Committee for the Defense of Leon Trotsky

1893 births
1979 deaths
Journalists from Kansas
American male journalists
20th-century American journalists
The Nation (U.S. magazine) people
Draft evaders
People from Killingworth, Connecticut
People from Medicine Lodge, Kansas
UC Berkeley College of Engineering alumni
Teachers College, Columbia University alumni
Historians of Latin America
20th-century American historians
American male non-fiction writers
20th-century American male writers
Historians from Kansas
Historians from Connecticut
Writers from Pasadena, California
Historians from California
Journalists from Connecticut
Journalists from California
American expatriates in Mexico